Children's Dispensary, also known as Hansel Center, is a historic hospital building located at South Bend, St. Joseph County, Indiana.  The main building was built in 1925, and is a two-story, "T"-plan, Classical Revival style brick building with limestone trim.  Also on the property are the contributing garage and surrounding wall dated to the 1910s. The dispensary provided a comprehensive program of general medical care to disadvantaged children. The building was renovated in 2012 to house the Notre Dame Center for Arts and Culture.

It was listed on the National Register of Historic Places in 1997.

References

External links
Notre Dame Center for Arts and Culture website

Hospital buildings on the National Register of Historic Places in Indiana
Neoclassical architecture in Indiana
Hospital buildings completed in 1925
Buildings and structures in South Bend, Indiana
National Register of Historic Places in St. Joseph County, Indiana